Amorphomyces is a genus of fungi in the family Laboulbeniaceae. A 2008 estimate placed 13 species in the genus.

Species
Amorphomyces biformis 
Amorphomyces falagriae Thaxt. (1893)
Amorphomyces floridanus 
Amorphomyces hernandoi 
Amorphomyces italicus 
Amorphomyces minisculus 
Amorphomyces minusculus 
Amorphomyces obliqueseptatus 
Amorphomyces ophioglossae 
Amorphomyces pronomaeae 
Amorphomyces rubescens 
Amorphomyces schistogeniae 
Amorphomyces stenusae 
Amorphomyces stipitatus 
Amorphomyces trogophloei

See also
List of Laboulbeniaceae genera

References

Laboulbeniales genera
Laboulbeniomycetes